Alexander Rupert Fiske-Harrison (born 22 July 1976) is an English author, actor, financier and conservationist.

His writing is known for his immersion in his subject matter. He trained and worked for some years as a Method actor. For his first book Into The Arena: The World Of The Spanish Bullfight he became a bullfighter. For his second, The Bulls Of Pamplona, he became a bull-runner.  

In 1998, he won the Oxford New Writing Prize with the play "The Death Of An Atheist", in 2011 he was shortlisted for the William Hill Sports Book of the Year for Into The Arena, his short story "Les Invincibles" was a published finalist in Le Prix Hemingway in France in 2016, and his short story "The Feldkirch Crossing", was listed for the Mogford Prize of the Financial Times Weekend Oxford Literary Festival in 2021.

Background and personal life

He is the youngest son of Clive Fiske Harrison. His brother Jules William Fiske Harrison was, according to The Times, a "skilled and fearless skier" who died in a skiing accident in Zermatt, Switzerland in 1988. He sits on the boards of the historic City of London stockbrokers Fiske & Co and Bragg, Stockdale, Hall & Co, founded in 1819.

He was educated at Eton and the University of Oxford, followed by The London School of Economics and Political Science and the University of London. He studied biological sciences, and then philosophy, politics and economics (PPE), before doing postgraduate work in the foundations of physics on the relationship between quantum theory and classical logic and then consciousness studies incorporating work in both foundations of psychology and animal behaviour. He also trained at the acting school, the Stella Adler Conservatory in New York City, when Marlon Brando was its chairman. (He was consultant on the Academy Award-nominated Universal Pictures' documentary on Brando, Listen To Me Marlon).

Fiske-Harrison is engaged to be married to Klarina Pichler, a professional polo player from Austria and captain of Las Sacras Romanas - 'The Holy Romans' - an international polo team. She is a descendant of Baron Leonhard Pichler von Weitenegg of the old Swabian nobility Lord of Hornstein and Seibersdorf and Councillor of the Court Chamber to Holy Roman Emperor Ferdinand I.

Journalism

Fiske-Harrison has written for newspapers and magazines including The Times, Financial Times, The Daily Telegraph, The Times Literary Supplement, GQ, and The Spectator, magazines and has been himself featured in the society pages of the Telegraph, Evening Standard and Condé Nast's Tatler.

He has been interviewed and provided commentary on broadcast media outlets including the BBC, CNN, Al-Jazeera, Discovery Channel, US National Public Radio. and the Australian Broadcasting Corporation National Radio.

He has also written in Spanish for ABC and El Norte de Castilla and has been himself featured in the society pages of ABC and¡Hola! magazine (Spanish parent of Hello! magazine.)

Conservation

Fiske-Harrison has written on wolves and dogs, cattle and horses, and apes. He often focuses on human perception of, and interaction with, animals.

Spain

Bullfighting

An essay on bullfighting for Prospect magazine in September 2008 led Fiske-Harrison to move to Spain to further research the topic. He lived, trained and fought alongside matadors including Juan José Padilla, Cayetano Rivera Ordóñez – whose father Paquirri was killed in the ring, and grandfather Antonio Ordóñez the subject of Hemingway's The Dangerous Summer – and Eduardo Dávila Miura of the Miura bull family. He wrote about his experiences on his blog The Last Arena: In Search of the Spanish Bullfight.

Into The Arena: The World Of The Spanish Bullfight

In 2011 Profile Books published his Into The Arena: The World of the Spanish Bullfight. The Sunday Times said that "it provides an engrossing introduction to Spain's 'great feast of art and danger'".

In answer to Animal Welfare and Animal Rights concerns, the Financial Times said, "it's to Fiske-Harrison's credit that he never quite gets over his moral qualms about bullfighting."

Bull-running

As part of his research in 2009, Fiske-Harrison began running with the bulls in Pamplona, and became a part of the 'Runners Team of the World', and continued to do it across the rest of Spain, including the encierros, 'bull-runs', of the Navarran towns of Tafalla and Falces, where the run is down a mountain path beside a sheer drop called "El Pilón"- in the municipality of San Sebastián de los Reyes and the ancient castle of Cuéllar in Old Castile, which hosts the oldest encierro in Spain, and where he was awarded a prize for writing about the encierros in 2013.

The Bulls Of Pamplona
In Spring 2014 Fiske-Harrison co-authored and edited the book The Bulls Of Pamplona, with a foreword from the Mayor of Pamplona and contributions from aficionados of the festival of San Fermín, including John Hemingway, grandson of Ernest Hemingway, Beatrice Welles, daughter of Orson Welles, along with chapters of advice from the most experienced American and Spanish bull-runners.

Drama

Fiske-Harrison's acting debut was as Govianus in The Second Maiden's Tragedy at the Hackney Empire theatre in London. He has also acted on the German stage and in independent film in the UK and Italy. He returned to acting in 2023 in The Honourable Way Out, a Cold War spy thriller produced by the British Forces Broadcasting Service (BFBS).

The Pendulum

The play is a two-act four-hander set in 1900 Vienna. Its first production was in the summer of 2008 at the Jermyn Street Theatre, in London's West End.

Michael Billington in The Guardian gave it three stars and said, "the author himself plays the disintegrating hero with the right poker-backed irascibility...  it is refreshing to find a new play that gets away from bedsit angst, one comes away with the sensation of having seen an accomplished historical play." The Sunday Times described it as "something earnest, nicely acted – if a little contained."

References

External links
 Alexander Fiske-Harrison Official Website

English writers
English male actors
English conservationists
People educated at Eton College
Alumni of St Peter's College, Oxford
1976 births
Living people
British bullfighters
Bull runners